Aladi Sankaraiya is a politician from alangulam'

Personal life
He have two daughters and one son named S. Anandaraj.

Political career
His political debut was from the periods of the late king maker Kamaraj.

Electoral performance in Assembly elections

References 

Indian National Congress politicians from Tamil Nadu
Living people
Year of birth missing (living people)